Shavrino is a rural locality (a village) in Vereshchaginsky District, Perm Krai, Russia.  The population was 11 as of 2010.

Geography 
It is located 29 km west of Vereshchagino (the district's administrative centre) by road. Cherepanovo is the nearest rural locality.

References 

Rural localities in Vereshchaginsky District